Sir Jonathan Stephen Cunliffe, CB (born 2 June 1953) is a senior British civil servant, currently serving as Deputy Governor of the Bank of England for Financial Stability.

Biography
Cunliffe studied at Manchester University. He lectured at the University of Western Ontario, before joining the UK Department of the Environment and Transport in 1980.

He was appointed Deputy Director for International Finance at HM Treasury in 1998, then promoted to Director of International Finance, and then managing director of Macroeconomic Policy and International Finance. In 2001 he became managing director of Finance, Regulation and Industry for a year, before reverting to managing director of Macroeconomic Policy and International Finance. In 2005 Cunliffe's position was promoted to that of Second Permanent Secretary, remaining managing director of Macroeconomic Policy and International Finance, later focussed to managing director of International and Finance.

In 2007 following Gordon Brown's appointment as Prime Minister, Cunliffe was appointed Head of the European and Global Issues Secretariat. This role included being the Prime Minister's Advisor on International Economic Affairs and on the EU in the Prime Minister's Office.

On 24 June 2011, Number 10 announced that Cunliffe would replace Kim Darroch as British Permanent Representative to the EU in January 2012. He was replaced in the role by Ivan Rogers.

Cunliffe currently serves as Deputy Governor of the Bank of England for Financial Stability. He took up the role in November 2013 and is an ex officio member of the Bank's Financial and Monetary Policy Committees and its Court of Directors. He replaced Paul Tucker when the latter was passed over for promotion to Governor in favour of Mark Carney, and chose instead when the announcement was made in June 2013 to lecture at Harvard.

In September 2020, Cunliffe was appointed to the UK Holocaust Memorial Foundation by the then Communities Secretary Robert Jenrick.

Cunliffe oversaw "Project Bookend", the Bank of England's project to examine the possible economic effects of the UK leaving the EU following the upcoming referendum. This was alleged to have been inadvertently revealed after a senior official emailed details about the project to an editor at The Guardian newspaper.

Views
Cunliffe suggested in a March 2014 speech at Chatham House that the domestic banks were too big to fail (TBTF), and instead of the nationalisation process used in the case of HBOS, RBS and threatened for Barclays (all in late 2008), could henceforth be bailed-in.

Personal life

Cunliffe, who is Anglo-Jewish, married his wife at the New London Synagogue in St John’s Wood, north-west London. He has two daughters, one of whom works as an online editor at the New Statesman.
 He was appointed a Companion of the Order of the Bath ("CB") in the New Year Honours 2001, and made a Knight Bachelor in the New Year Honours 2010.

References

External links 
European and Global Issues Secretariat homepage

Second Permanent Secretaries of HM Treasury
Monetary Policy Committee members
Civil servants in the Cabinet Office
Living people
1953 births
Alumni of the University of Manchester
Companions of the Order of the Bath
Knights Bachelor
Fellows of Nuffield College, Oxford
Deputy Governors of the Bank of England